E già is an album by the Italian singer and songwriter Lucio Battisti. It was released in September 1982 by Numero Uno.

The album was Italy's 14th best selling album in 1982.

The pictures for the cover were taken by Gered Mankowitz at Mother Ivy's Bay in Cornwall, UK. The smiles on the cover were drawn by Battisti's son, Luca, who at the time was 9.

Track listing 
All lyrics written by Velezia (Grazia Letizia Veronese), all music composed by Lucio Battisti.
 "Scrivi il tuo nome" (Write Down Your Name) – 2:25
 "Mistero" (Mystery) – 3:05
 "Windsurf windsurf" – 2:47
 "Rilassati ed ascolta" (Relax and Listen) – 3:20
 "Non sei più solo" (You're Not Alone Anymore) – 2:46
 "Straniero" (Foreigner) – 4:43
 "Registrazione" (Recording) – 2:26
 "La tua felicità" (Your Happiness) – 2:18
 "Hi - fi" – 2:44
 "Slow motion" – 3:56
 "Una montagna" (A Mountain) – 3:40
 "E già" (And Already) – 2:55

References

1982 albums
Lucio Battisti albums